Bokel may refer to:
 Bokel, Lower Saxony, in the district of Cuxhaven, Lower Saxony
 Bokel, Pinneberg, in the district of Pinneberg, Schleswig-Holstein
 Bokel, Rendsburg-Eckernförde, in the district of Rendsburg-Eckernförde, Schleswig-Holstein
 Claudia Bokel (born 1973), German épée fencer
 Radost Bokel (born 1975), German actress